German submarine U-648 was a Type VIIC U-boat of Nazi Germany's Kriegsmarine during World War II. The submarine was laid down on 24 December 1941 at the Blohm & Voss yard at Hamburg, launched on 16 September 1942, and commissioned on 12 November 1942 under the command of Leutnant zur See d.R. Peter-Arthur Stahl.

Attached to 5th U-boat Flotilla based at Kiel, U-648 completed her training period on 30 April 1943 and was assigned to front-line service.

Design
German Type VIIC submarines were preceded by the shorter Type VIIB submarines. U-648 had a displacement of  when at the surface and  while submerged. She had two shafts and two  propellers.

U-648 was fitted with five  torpedo tubes (four fitted at the bow and one at the stern), fourteen torpedoes, one  SK C/35 naval gun, 220 rounds, and one twin  C/30 anti-aircraft gun. The boat had a complement of between forty-four and sixty.

Service history
U-648 was last heard from on 22 November 1943 during her third war patrol and has been missing ever since.

Previously recorded fate

References

Bibliography

External links

German Type VIIC submarines
1942 ships
Ships built in Hamburg
U-boats commissioned in 1942
U-boats sunk in 1943
Missing U-boats of World War II
World War II shipwrecks in the Atlantic Ocean
World War II submarines of Germany
Maritime incidents in November 1943